Ryan William Cook (born June 30, 1987), nicknamed "Cookie", is an American former professional baseball pitcher. He played for the Arizona Diamondbacks, Oakland Athletics, Boston Red Sox and Seattle Mariners of Major League Baseball (MLB) and for the Yomiuri Giants of Nippon Professional Baseball (NPB). He was an MLB All-Star in 2012.

Career

Amateur
Cook attended Clovis High School in Clovis, California, and the University of Southern California (USC), where he played college baseball for the USC Trojans baseball team. In 2007, he played collegiate summer baseball with the Brewster Whitecaps of the Cape Cod Baseball League.

Arizona Diamondbacks
The Arizona Diamondbacks selected Cook in the 27th round of the 2008 Major League Baseball draft. He was called up to the majors for the first time on July 20, 2011.

Oakland Athletics
On December 9, 2011, the Diamondbacks traded Cook, along with Jarrod Parker and Collin Cowgill, to the Oakland Athletics for Trevor Cahill and Craig Breslow.

On April 27, 2012, against the Baltimore Orioles, Cook became the 61st player in MLB history to record four strikeouts in one inning. He was the Athletics' representative at the 2012 All-Star Game where he pitched a perfect seventh inning. In 2013, Cook repeated his 2012 performance by going 6–4 in 71 games. He had a 2.54 earned run average with 67 strikeouts in 67 innings pitched. Despite a pair of injuries during the 2014 season, Cook appeared in 54 games.

Boston Red Sox
On July 31, 2015, Cook was traded to the Boston Red Sox for a player to be named later.

Chicago Cubs
Cook was claimed off waivers by the Chicago Cubs on November 6, 2015, however his contract was non-tendered on December 2, 2015, making Cook a free agent.

Seattle Mariners
On January 7, 2016, Cook signed a one-year deal with the Seattle Mariners. He was outrighted to the minors on November 2, 2016.

Cook missed the entire 2017 season after having Tommy John surgery.

Cook began the 2018 season with the Triple-A Tacoma Rainiers and impressed with a 2.03 ERA and 17 strikeouts in 13.1 innings pitched. He was called up to the Mariners on May 17, 2018.

Yomiuri Giants
On December 29, 2018, Cook signed with the Yomiuri Giants of Nippon Professional Baseball (NPB).

On December 2, 2019, he became a free agent.

Miami Marlins
On January 6, 2020, Cook signed a minor league deal with the Miami Marlins. Cook was released by the Marlins organization on July 20, 2020.

See also

 List of Major League Baseball single-inning strikeout leaders

References

External links

1987 births
Living people
American expatriate baseball players in Japan
American League All-Stars
Arizona League Mariners players
Arizona Diamondbacks players
Baseball players from California
Boston Red Sox players
Brewster Whitecaps players
Major League Baseball pitchers
Mobile BayBears players
Nashville Sounds players
Nippon Professional Baseball pitchers
Oakland Athletics players
Pawtucket Red Sox players
Reno Aces players
Seattle Mariners players
South Bend Silver Hawks players
Sportspeople from Clovis, California
Stockton Ports players
Tacoma Rainiers players
USC Trojans baseball players
Visalia Rawhide players
Yakima Bears players
Yomiuri Giants players